The Men's 400m Individual Medley (IM) event at the 2007 Pan American Games was staged at the Maria Lenk Aquatic Park in Rio de Janeiro, Brazil on 16 and 17 July. 18 swimmers swam prelims of the event, the top-8 of which advanced to the next day's final.

Medalists

Records

Results

Notes

References
 Official Site
 Official Results

Medley, Men's 400